Stephen P. Lamb was a judge in the U.S. state of Delaware. He served on the Delaware Court of Chancery with the title of vice chancellor.

He left the court in 2009, and has now returned to private practice with the firm Paul, Weiss, Rifkind, Wharton & Garrison where he is a partner in the Corporate and Litigation Departments,.

Education
J.D., Georgetown University Law Center, 1975
B.A., University of Pennsylvania, 1971

References
 Delaware State Courts - Court of Chancery - Judges

External links
Practising Law Institute - What All Business Lawyers and Litigations Must Know About Delaware Law Developments 2007, Apr. 25, 2007, PLI New York Center -- New York, NY Co-chair is Stephen P. Lamb

Living people
Year of birth missing (living people)
Vice Chancellors of Delaware
Paul, Weiss, Rifkind, Wharton & Garrison people
University of Pennsylvania alumni
Georgetown University Law Center alumni